Canopy conductance, commonly denoted , is a dimensionless quantity characterizing radiation distribution in tree canopy. By definition, it is calculated as a ratio of daily water use to daily mean vapor pressure deficit (VPD). Canopy conductance can be also experimentally obtained by measuring sap flow and environmental variables. Stomatal conductance may be used as a reference value to validate the data, by summing the total stomatal conductance  of all leaf classes within the canopy.

See also
 Ecohydrology
 Stomatal conductance
 Transpiration

References 

Plant physiology